Gibraltar is a 1938 French thriller film directed by Fedor Ozep and starring Viviane Romance, Roger Duchesne, Abel Jacquin and Erich von Stroheim.

It was shot at the Joinville Studios in Paris, with location shooting taking place in Gibraltar itself despite the Spanish Civil War being fought across the border. The film's sets were designed by the art director Georges Wakhévitch. It was later remade in 1964 under the same title.

The plot concerns a British officer stationed in Gibraltar who goes undercover to infiltrate a gang of hostile agents.

Main cast
 Viviane Romance as Mercedes
 Roger Duchesne as Robert Jackson
 Abel Jacquin as Frank Lloyd
 Erich von Stroheim as Marson
 Jean Périer as Col. Wilcox 
 Yvette Lebon as Maud Wilcox
 Paulette Pax as Mme. Nichols
 André Roanne as Le Lt. Français 
 Georges Flamant as Maori 
 Odette Talazac as Angelina, Dresser
 Madeleine Suffel as Nelly, Manicurist

See also
The Sharks of Gibraltar (1947)
Gibraltar (1964)

References

Bibliography
 Julio Ponce Alberca Gibraltar and the Spanish Civil War, 1936-39: Local, National and International Perspectives. Bloomsbury Publishing, 2015.

External links

1938 films
1930s spy thriller films
French spy thriller films
1930s thriller drama films
French thriller drama films
1930s French-language films
Films directed by Fedor Ozep
French black-and-white films
Films set in the British Empire
Films set in the Mediterranean Sea
Cine-Allianz films
Films shot at Joinville Studios
1938 drama films
1930s French films